Slapgard is a surname. Notable people with the surname include:

Bjarne Slapgard (1901–1997), Norwegian educator and author
Sigrun Slapgard (born 1953), Norwegian journalist and non-fiction writer

Surnames of Norwegian origin